The 1862 Delaware gubernatorial election was held on November 4, 1862. Incumbent Democratic Governor William Burton was unable to seek re-election. Samuel Jefferson ran to succeed him as the Democratic nominee, and he faced National Union candidate William Cannon, the former State Treasurer. Cannon narrowly defeated Jefferson, and in so doing, was the last Republican-affiliated candidate to be elected Governor until 1894.

General election

Results

References

Bibliography
 
 
 
 Delaware House Journal, 69th General Assembly, 1st Reg. Sess. (1863).

1862
Delaware
Gubernatorial